RTI(-4229)-177 (2β-(3-phenylisoxazol-5-yl)-3β-(4-chlorophenyl)tropane, β-CPPIT) is a synthetic stimulant drug from the phenyltropane family, which acts as a DRI with micromolar affinity for the SERT. RTI-177 has an unusually long duration of action of 20 hours or more, substantially longer than the related compound RTI-336 from which it differs in molecular structure only by the absence of a p-methyl group.

"the nonselective monoamine transporter inhibitor RTI-126 and the DAT-selective inhibitors RTI-150 and RTI-336 both had a faster rate of onset (30 min) and a short duration of action (4h). In contrast, the nonselective monoamine transporter inhibitor RTI-112 had a slower rate of onset (30–60 min) and a longer duration of action (10h). The DAT-selective inhibitors RTI-171 and RTI-177 also had slower rates of onset (30–120 min), but RTI-171 had a short duration of action (2.5 h) while RTI-177 had a very long duration of action (20 h)."

Update
Lower reinforcing strength of the phenyltropane cocaine analogs RTI-336 and RTI-177 compared to cocaine in nonhuman primates.

Comparison of six MAT inhibitors

In the Lindsey paper, RTI-177 was wrongly considered to be a dual inhibitor of the NET, although this was later found out to be incorrect.

"In acute toxicity studies in male rats, 3β-(4-chlorophenyl)-2β-[3-(4’-methylphenyl)isoxazol-5-yl]tropane (RTI-336) possessed an LD50 of 180 mg/kg after oral administration, compared with 49 mg/kg for RTI-177 (unpublished results, Howell 2005; Table 9). These results suggested that RTI-336 was a better candidate than RTI-177 for further preclinical development."

Also the potency of the heterocyclic compounds is not as great as would be predicted based on in vitro test results.

References 

Chloroarenes
Tropanes
RTI compounds
Dopamine reuptake inhibitors
Stimulants
Isoxazoles